Freziera rufescens is a species of plant in the Pentaphylacaceae family. It is endemic to Ecuador.

References

rufescens
Endemic flora of Ecuador
Vulnerable plants
Taxonomy articles created by Polbot